George Marich (born 11 July 1992 in Kroonstad, South Africa) is a South African rugby union player who last played with the . His regular position is tighthead prop.

Career

Youth and Varsity Shield rugby

Marich played his high school rugby for Kroonstad-based high school Die Afrikaanse Hoërskool Kroonstad (Rooiskool). In 2010, while still at school, he was included in the  side that played in the 2010 Under-19 Provincial Championship, making five appearances. Still eligible for the U19s in 2011, he started all eight of their matches during the 2011 Under-19 Provincial Championship, helping the  win Group B, the second tier of this competition, beating  21–10 in the final in Wellington. He also played in the subsequent promotion/relegation match against  as the Griffons lost 18–14 and failed to win promotion to Group A.

In 2012, he was a member of the  squad that played in the 2012 Varsity Shield competition.

Narbonne / Castres

Marich then moved to France to join French Rugby Pro D2 side Narbonne for the 2012–13 Rugby Pro D2 season. He made his first class debut for them in the Round One match against Pau, but could not prevent them suffering a 13–17 defeat. In total, he made eight appearances for the side during the 2012–13 season, all of them coming off the bench, as he helped Narbonne finish in 9th place in the league.

He then joined Top 14 side Castres for the 2013–14 Top 14 season. However, he didn't make any first team appearances for them during the season.

Free State Cheetahs

References

South African rugby union players
Living people
1992 births
People from Kroonstad
Rugby union props
Free State Cheetahs players
Rugby union players from the Free State (province)